Boris Borisovich Yegorov (26 November 1937 – 12 September 1994) was a Soviet physician-cosmonaut who became the first physician to make a space flight.

Yegorov came from a medical background, with his father a prominent heart surgeon, and his mother an ophthalmologist. He also selected medicine as a career and graduated from the First Moscow State Medical University in 1961. During the course of his studies, he came into contact with Yuri Gagarin's training and became interested in space medicine.

Yegorov earned his doctorate in medicine, with his specialization being in disorders of the sense of balance.

Yegorov was selected as a member of the multi-disciplinary team that flew on Voskhod 1. It has been suggested that his father's influence within the Politburo may have had some bearing on the selection. As a result of this space flight, Yegorov was awarded the title of the Hero of the Soviet Union on October 19, 1964.

He died from a heart attack in 1994.

Family
Yegorov was married three times and fathered three children. and died

Honors
He was awarded:
Hero of the Soviet Union
Pilot-Cosmonaut of the USSR
Order of Lenin
Order of the Red Banner of Labour
Medal "For the Development of Virgin Lands"
Nine jubilee medals
Hero of Socialist Labour (Vietnam)
Banner Order of the Hungarian People's Republic

Literature 
 "Rockets and people" – B. E. Chertok, M: "mechanical engineering", 1999. 
 "The hidden space" – Nikolai Kamanin, М: "Инфортекс-ИФ, 1995.
 "S. P. Korolev. Encyclopedia of life and creativity" - edited by C. A. Lopota, RSC Energia. S. P. Korolev, 2014 
The official website of the city administration Baikonur - Honorary citizens of Baikonur

1937 births
1994 deaths
Physicians from Moscow
1964 in spaceflight
I.M. Sechenov First Moscow State Medical University alumni
Voskhod program cosmonauts
Heroes of the Soviet Union
Honoured Masters of Sport of the USSR
Recipients of the Order of Lenin
Recipients of the Order of the Red Banner of Labour
Physician astronauts
Soviet cosmonauts
Soviet neurologists
Burials at Novodevichy Cemetery